Willoughton Priory was a priory  in Lincolnshire, England.

Monasteries in Lincolnshire